Louis John Andrus (born July 10, 1943) is a former professional American football linebacker American Football League (AFL). He played one season for the Denver Broncos (1967). He played college football at Brigham Young University.

See also
 List of American Football League players

References

1943 births
Living people
American football linebackers
American players of Canadian football
BYU Cougars football players
Denver Broncos (AFL) players
Winnipeg Blue Bombers players
People from Murray, Utah
Players of American football from Utah